Euphoria kernii, or Kern's flower scarab, is a species of scarab beetle in the family Scarabaeidae.

References

Further reading

External links

 

Cetoniinae
Articles created by Qbugbot
Beetles described in 1852